Pulakode  is a village in Thrissur district in the state of Kerala, India.

Demographics
 India census, Pulakode had a population of 5088 with 2395 males and 2693 females.

References

Villages in Thrissur district